Barbara van Bergen (born 9 June 1978) is a Dutch wheelchair basketball player and para-alpine skier.

Career

Wheelchair basketball
Van Bergen began her career in 2007 with the team of the Rotterdam Arrows'81 and in 2008 played for the Dutch women's wheelchair basketball team at the 2008 Summer Paralympics in Beijing, where they reached the quarter-finals. Three years later, the Dutch wheelchair basketball team qualified for the 2012 Summer Paralympics in London. After losing in the semi-final, they won the bronze medal match. 

After winning gold at the 2013 Women's European Wheelchair Basketball Championship in Frankfurt, and bronze at the 2014 Women's World Wheelchair Basketball Championship in Toronto, the Dutch team won the silver medal at the 2015 Women's European Wheelchair Basketball Championship, thus qualifying for the 2016 Summer Paralympics in Rio de Janeiro, where they won the bronze medal once again.

Para-alpine skiing
Van Bergen has been active in sitting para-alpine skiing since 2014. After the 2016 Paralympic Games, she focused on this sport. In December 2021, she managed to qualify for the 2022 Winter Paralympics in Beijing. At the 2021 World Para Snow Sports Championships held in Lillehammer, Norway, van Bergen won the silver medal in the downhill event.

References

External links 
 Official website

1978 births
Living people
Sportspeople from Rotterdam
Dutch female alpine skiers
Dutch women's wheelchair basketball players
Wheelchair category Paralympic competitors
Paralympic wheelchair basketball players of the Netherlands
Paralympic bronze medalists for the Netherlands
Paralympic medalists in wheelchair basketball
Wheelchair basketball players at the 2008 Summer Paralympics
Wheelchair basketball players at the 2012 Summer Paralympics
Wheelchair basketball players at the 2016 Summer Paralympics
Medalists at the 2012 Summer Paralympics
Medalists at the 2016 Summer Paralympics
Alpine skiers at the 2022 Winter Paralympics
Paralympic alpine skiers of the Netherlands
21st-century Dutch women